Li Zhen (born 31 January 1979) is a Chinese synchronized swimmer who competed in the 2000 Summer Olympics and in the 2004 Summer Olympics and was coached by Suting Zhai.

References

1979 births
Living people
Chinese synchronized swimmers
Olympic synchronized swimmers of China
Synchronized swimmers at the 2000 Summer Olympics
Synchronized swimmers at the 2004 Summer Olympics
Asian Games medalists in artistic swimming
Synchronized swimmers from Tianjin
Artistic swimmers at the 2002 Asian Games
Medalists at the 2002 Asian Games
Asian Games bronze medalists for China